Paolo Fradiani is an Italian classical composer and professor.

Biography and career 
Born in Avezzano, Italy in 1984, studied music at Conservatoire of Music "Alfredo Casella" in L'Aquila and at Staatliche Hochschule für Musik und Darstellende Kunst in Mannheim. He studied music composition with Mauro Cardi at L'Aquila Conservatoire and with Sidney Corbett at the Mannheim Musikhochschule; studied jazz double bass with Luca Bulgarelli at L'Aquila Conservatoire.

His works have been performed by relevant orchestras, ensembles and soloists in Austria, Belgium, Canada, Croatia, Finland, France, Germany, Hungary, Italy, Netherlands, Norway, Poland, South Korea, Spain, Sweden, Switzerland, Turkey, United Kingdom and USA including Berliner Philharmoniker soloists; and was also broadcast on the Dutch national radio station NPO Radio 4 and to the German SR 2 Kulturradio.

Fradiani has received several prizes by Italian Ministry of Education and Italian Ministry of Cultural Heritage and Activities and Tourism. In 2017 has been composer in residence at Società Aquilana dei Concerti “B. Barattelli”.

He also composed the music for the silent film by Charles Bowers “Now You Tell One” (1926) for the Franco-German television Arte.

His works are published by Da Vinci Edition, Donemus Publishing, Edition Margaux and Universal Edition.

Selected works
Compositions
 Acropolis, for ensemble or chamber orchestra
 Arabesque, for violoncello
 Archetypi, for orchestra
 Butterfly, Butterfly, for children's choir & ensemble
 Capriccio, for violin
 Delphi's Muse, for harp
 Kindermusik, for piano
 Kiş, for children's choir & ensemble
 Limited Expansion Universe, for string orchestra
 Luz, for voice and piano
 Nocturne, for piano
 Orationem, for clarinet and organ
 Psalm VIII, for mezzo-soprano, bass and organ
 Sfere di Luce in Movimento su Sfondo Nero, for string quartet
 Spirali, for guitar
The Rite Without Spring – Music for environmental sustainability, for chamber Orchestra
 Tre Aforismi, for piano

Arrangements
 Claude Debussy – Golliwogg's Cakewalk, for ensemble or chamber orchestra
 Claude Debussy – Prélude à l'après-midi d'un faune, for ensemble or chamber orchestra
 Gabriel Fauré – Pavane Op. 50, for ensemble or chamber orchestra
 Gustav Mahler – Kindertotenlieder, for voice and ensemble or chamber orchestra
 Jules Massenet – Méditation, for violin and ensemble or chamber orchestra
Giacomo Puccini – Quando me’n vo’ from La Bohème, for soprano and ensemble or chamber orchestra
 Maurice Ravel – Ma Mère l'Oye, for ensemble or chamber orchestra
 Maurice Ravel – Pavane pour une infante défunte, for ensemble or chamber orchestra
 Maurice Ravel – Shéhérazade, for voice and ensemble or chamber orchestra
 Nikolai Rimsky-Korsakov – Scheherazade, for ensemble or chamber orchestra
 Gioachino Rossini – Ouverture from La gazza ladra, for ensemble or chamber orchestra
Satie Erik – Gymnopédie No.1, for ensemble or chamber orchestra
Satie Erik – Gymnopédie No.3, for ensemble or chamber orchestra
Giuseppe Verdi – E’ Strano! Sempre Libera from La Traviata, for soprano and ensemble or chamber orchestra
 Giuseppe Verdi – Sinfonia from I vespri siciliani (Les vêpres siciliennes), for ensemble or chamber orchestra

References

External links
 
 List of works edited by Paolo Fradiani on the Da Vinci Edition website
 List of works edited by Paolo Fradiani on the Donemus Publishing website
 List of works edited by Paolo Fradiani on the Edition Margaux website
 List of works edited by Paolo Fradiani on the Universal Edition website

21st-century classical composers
Italian classical composers
1984 births
Living people